Listen, Judge is a 1952 short subject directed by Edward Bernds starring American slapstick comedy team The Three Stooges (Moe Howard, Larry Fine and Shemp Howard). It is the 138th entry in the series released by Columbia Pictures starring the comedians, who released 190 shorts for the studio between 1934 and 1959.

Plot
The Stooges are repairmen who are on trial for stealing chickens, but are found not guilty. However, Shemp opens his suit jacket, resulting in a live chicken flying out of his grip and into the face of Judge Henderson (Vernon Dent). The boys then flee the courtroom and pursue some work.

The trio comes upon a lady customer (Kitty McHugh) whose doorbell is in need of repair. The Stooges manage to ruin most of the house while working on the wiring, ultimately clobbering the chef (Emil Sitka) who is preparing dinner at the customer's house. The irate chef abruptly quits, resulting in the Stooges being hired to prepare dinner for her husband's friend George Morton's (John R. Hamilton) birthday party. To their shock and horror, the party in question involves none other than Judge Henderson, and their lady customer is the Judge's wife.

Now frantic, the trio try their best to make the dinner partially edible. All hell nearly breaks loose when the birthday cake they prepare is accidentally pierced, deflating in the process. The cake is then "re-inflated" using town gas through the gas stove's connection.

During the party, Morton blows out the candles, and the gas-filled cake explodes all over him and the judge, also ruining Henderson's chance for re-election. George Morton's wife, Lydia emerges wearing a large board sign and Henderson angrily realizes who the new "help" are. The short ends when the Stooges are chased away by the judge's shotgun.

Production notes
Filmed on November 6–8, 1951, Listen, Judge is a hybrid of plot devices borrowed from three different Stooge films featuring former Stooge Curly Howard:
 The chicken stealing sequence in the courtroom is from A Plumbing We Will Go.
 The doorbell repair sequence is from They Stooge to Conga.
 The food preparation sequences and exploding cake (comprising the second half of the film) are from An Ache in Every Stake.

It is also the last film released during Eddie Laughton's lifetime. He passed away 15 days later on March 21, 1952, which was two months after Curly Howard's death.

Listen, Judge was the last Stooge short to be released on 17 minutes, the future shorts were change to 15 and 16 minutes.

References

External links 
 
 
Listen, Judge at threestooges.net

1952 films
1952 comedy films
The Three Stooges films
American black-and-white films
Films directed by Edward Bernds
The Three Stooges film remakes
Columbia Pictures short films
American comedy short films
1950s English-language films
1950s American films